Fatikchhari is a city and municipality
in Chittagong District in the division of Chittagong, Bangladesh. It is the administrative headquarter and urban centre of Fatikchhari Upazila.

References

Chittagong Division
Fatikchhari Upazila